Pastelitos de hoja is a Sephardic Jewish pastry originating in the Jewish community that formerly existed in Tetouan, Morocco.

Overview
Pastelitos de hoja consist of a pastry made from a dough made from eggs, flour, salt, baking soda, margarine (in order to be pareve in accordance with kashrut). This dough is then rolled out and filled with a filling made from ground beef, onions, parsley, bay leaves and spices such as turmeric, ground nutmeg. It is then brushed with an egg wash and baked.

References

Jewish baked goods
Sephardi Jewish cuisine
Pastries
Beef dishes